Jhalawan (Brahui: جھالاوان) was an administrative division of the  Khanate of Kalat, a princely state of Brahui that acceded to Pakistan in 1947. It was established in the 17th century and its boundary was fixed with Sindh in 1853.  It was located in the southeastern part of Kalat State, north of Las Bela, west of the Kachi and Sindh and east of the Kharan and Makran.

References

Further reading
 
 Swidler, N. (1972) "The Development of the Kalat Khanate" Journal of Asian and African Studies 7:  pp. 115–21

External links
 Kalat District - Planning and Development Department of Balochistan Government
 The Land and People of Baluchistan
 A synopsis of the modern history of Balochistan and the state of Kalat 
 Genealogy of the Khans of Kalat

Khanate of Kalat